Gualaca District is a district (distrito) of Chiriquí Province in Panama. The population according to the 2000 census was 8,348. The district covers a total area of 626 km2. The capital lies at the city of Gualaca.

Administrative divisions
Gualaca District is divided administratively into the following corregimientos:

Gualaca (capital)
Hornito
Los Angeles
Paja de Sombrero
Rincón

References

Districts of Panama
Chiriquí Province